Illegimitation is a compilation album released by German Technical Death Metal band Obscura. It was independently released by the band via crowdfunding.

Album information
Illegimitation is a compilation of the band's first demo of the same name, pre-production demos from Cosmogenesis, recorded in 2006, and three covers of songs originally done by the bands Death, Atheist and Cynic which were included to reference some of the influences for the band.

Track listing

Personnel
2003 "Illegimitation" Demo (Tracks 1-4)
Steffen Kummerer - Guitars
Armin Seitz - Guitars
Martin Ketzer - Vocals, Bass
Jonas Baumgartl - Drums, Cello

2006 Preproduction Demo (Tracks 5-7)
Steffen Kummerer - Guitars, Vocals
Markus Lempsch - Guitars, Vocals
Jonas Fischer - Bass
Jonas Baumgartl - Drums

2011 Recording Session (Tracks 8-10)
 Steffen Kummerer - lead guitar, vocals
 Christian Münzner − lead guitar
 Linus Klausenitzer − fretless bass
 Hannes Grossmann - drums

References

External links
 http://www.realmofobscura.com/

Obscura (band) albums
2012 albums